Gombe Bulls is a Nigerian professional basketball team located in Gombe State. The team competes in the Nigerian Premier League.

History
The team participated in the 2017 FIBA Africa Clubs Champions Cup, which was the first time the team played in the top continental league in Africa. The Bulls finished 11th with a 2–5 record.

In 2018, Gombe won their first ever Nigerian title after defeating Kwara Falcons in the final.

Honours
Nigerian Premier League
Champions (1): 2018
Runners-up (1): 2017

In African competitions
FIBA Africa Clubs Champions Cup  (1 appearance)
2017 – Preliminary Round

Notable players

 John Idu 
 Abdulwahad Yakubu

References

External links
Presentation at Afrobasket.com

Basketball teams in Nigeria
Basketball teams established in 1985
Gombe State
1985 establishments in Nigeria